Two ships in the United States Navy have been named USS Harding, in honor of Seth Harding.

, was a  reclassified as DMS-28.

United States Navy ship names